Gilligaloola is a heritage-listed residence located at 82-84 Pennant Hills Road, Normanhurst in the Hornsby Shire local government area of New South Wales, Australia. It was designed by Norman Selfe who was involved in the design, and built during 1893. It was added to the New South Wales State Heritage Register on 2 April 1999.

History 
Gilligaloola was constructed in 1893 on 14 acres of land and planted with Italian gardens and orchards. It was built for Norman Selfe, a prominent civil engineer, after whom the suburb Normanhurst takes its name.

The architect and builder of the house is unknown, but the design and character of certain details appear to suggest that Selfe was himself involved. The following obituary taken from the 16 October 1911 edition of The Sydney Morning Herald described the significant contribution that Selfe made at the turn of the century:

In November 1981 community representations were made to the Heritage Branch raising concerns for the future of Gilligaloola. At the time there was a proposal to subdivide the grounds of approximately one hectare into five separate lots. Subdivision plans showed lot boundaries particularly close to Gilligaloola and the grounds reputedly contained predominantly intact stylistic and horticultural elements.

Following consideration of the matter the Heritage Council of New South Wales considered the matter at its 27 November 1981 meeting and recommended to the Minister the making of an Interim Heritage Order. An Interim Heritage Order was gazetted on 8 January 1982 over the five lots. On 16 December 1983 the Interim Heritage Order over the five lots was revoked and a Permanent Conservation Order placed over Lot 1 DP 262809 on 16 December 1983. Gilligaloola was transferred to the State Heritage Register on 2 April 1999.

Description 
Site and garden
Gilligaloola's mature trees are a prominent local landmark.

A modern brick fence is not sympathetic.

Buildings
Gilligaloola consists of two buildings:

The first and original portion is a timber framed two storey farmhouse built in timber studwork with timber shiplap. It has timber floors and is built on brick piers. The second being a two-storey brick residence was added to the original portion in 1893. The two-storey brick house has picturesque verandahs to the north, east and west elevations and a large tower. The upper story is timber framed and decoratively shingles and lath and plaster lined. The front section of the roof is ripple iron. The house is finely detailed throughout with five panelled doors and baronial style marble fireplaces. Remarkable Arts and Crafts chimneys and quality decorative woodwork complement the house.

Modifications and dates 
1991funding assistance provided for renewing guttering, downpipes, roof carpentry, repainting external areas and reline and refloor back verandah and rejoint areas of brickwork.
September 1992approval given for construction of garage on northern corner of property.

Heritage listing 
As at 16 April 2013, Gilligaloola was of State heritage significance as the family home of Norman Selfe, the 19th century engineer and innovator, after which the suburb of Normanhurst was named. Constructed in 1893, Gilligaloola is an imposing two storey house with fine Art Nouvea detailing and has outstanding architectural character. The detailing suggests the Selfe was involved with its design.

Gilligaloola was listed on the New South Wales State Heritage Register on 2 April 1999.

See also 

Australian residential architectural styles

References

Bibliography

Attribution

External links

New South Wales State Heritage Register
Houses in the Hornsby Shire
Articles incorporating text from the New South Wales State Heritage Register
1893 establishments in Australia
Houses completed in 1893
Buildings and structures completed in 1893